Lord Houghton or Baron Houghton may refer to:

Richard Monckton Milnes, 1st Baron Houghton (1809–1885), or his descendants, the Barons Houghton
Douglas Houghton, Baron Houghton of Sowerby (1898–1996), unrelated to the previous
Nick Houghton, Baron Houghton of Richmond (born 1954), retired British Army officer